The Verlot Public Service Center used to be a ranger station, but is now just a visitor center after combining with the Darrington Ranger District. It is located on the Mountain Loop Highway eleven miles east of Granite Falls and is part of the Mt. Baker-Snoqualmie National Forest. The center was constructed by the CCC during the Great Depression and the building reflects the architectural style of that time. The building houses a museum, and maps, weather and hiking information, books, and park passes are available. Nearby popular trails include the Big Four Ice Caves and Mount Pilchuck.

References

External links

National Register of Historic Places Listing
Verlot Public Service Center - US Forest Service

Park buildings and structures on the National Register of Historic Places in Washington (state)
Buildings and structures in Snohomish County, Washington
Museums in Snohomish County, Washington
United States Forest Service ranger stations
Civilian Conservation Corps in Washington (state)
National Register of Historic Places in Snohomish County, Washington